The Sri Lanka national u-20 Football team represents Sri Lanka in International Youth Football tournaments. Sri Lanka U-20 football team has a long history dating back to the 1960s. The Sri Lanka U-20 football team has yet to qualify for the FIFA U-20 World Cup. The team has qualified for the Quarter Finals of the 1967 AFC Youth Championship.

History 
Sri Lanka U-20 football team has a long history back to late 1960s. Sri Lanka U-20 Team was a competitor in the first AFC Youth Championship. Sri Lanka qualified for the Quarter Finals in 1967 AFC Youth Championship.

Tournament Records

FIFA U-20 World Cup

AFC U-19 Championship

Fixtures and results

2022

See also
Sri Lanka national football team
Sri Lanka women's national football team
Sri Lanka national under-23 football team
Sri Lanka national under-17 football team

External links
 Football Federation of Sri Lanka
 Sri Lanka on FIFA

References 

under-20
Sri Lanka